The GeForce 300 series is a series of Tesla-based graphics processing units developed by Nvidia, first released in November 2009. Its cards are rebrands of the GeForce 200 series cards, available only for OEMs. All GPUs of the series support Direct3D 10.1, except the GT 330 (Direct3D 10.0).

History 
On November 27, 2009, Nvidia released its first GeForce 300 series video card, the GeForce 310. However, this card is a re-brand of one of Nvidia's older models (the GeForce 210) and not based on the newer Fermi architecture.

On February 2, 2010, Nvidia announced the release of the GeForce GT 320, GT 330 and GT 340, available to OEMs only. The Geforce GT 340 is simply a rebadged GT 240, sharing exactly the same specifications, while the GT 320 and 330 were newer cards (albeit still based on the previous generation GT200b and G92b architecture).

Chipset table

Discontinued support 
NVIDIA ceased driver support for the GeForce 300 series on April 1, 2016.

 Windows XP 32-bit & Media Center Edition: version 340.52 released on July 29, 2014; Download
 Windows XP 64-bit: version 340.52 released on July 29, 2014; Download
 Windows Vista, 7, 8, 8.1 32-bit: version 342.01 (WHQL) released on December 14, 2016; Download
 Windows Vista, 7, 8, 8.1 64-bit: version 342.01 (WHQL) released on December 14, 2016; Download
 Windows 10, 32-bit: version 342.01 (WHQL) released on December 14, 2016; Download
 Windows 10, 64-bit: version 342.01 (WHQL) released on December 14, 2016; Download

See also 
 GeForce 8 series
 GeForce 9 series
 GeForce 100 series
 GeForce 200 series
 GeForce 400 series
 GeForce 500 series
 GeForce 600 series
 Nvidia Quadro
 Nvidia Tesla

References 

Computer-related introductions in 2009
300 series
Graphics cards